The Shire of Isis was a local government area located in the Wide Bay–Burnett region of Queensland, Australia, to the south of Bundaberg.

History

The Isis Division was established on 1 January 1887 under the Divisional Boards Act 1887, on land previously part of the Burrum Division.

With the passage of the Local Authorities Act 1902, Isis Division became the Shire of Isis on 31 March 1903.

On 15 March 2008, under the Local Government (Reform Implementation) Act 2007 passed by the Parliament of Queensland on 10 August 2007, the Shire of Isis merged with the City of Bundaberg and the Shires of Burnett and Kolan to form the Bundaberg Region.

Towns and localities
The Shire of Isis included the following settlements:

 Childers
 Apple Tree Creek
 Booyal
 Buxton
 Cordalba
 Doolbi
 Farnsfield
 Goodwood
 Horton
 Isis Central
 North Isis
 Redridge
 Woodgate

Chairmen
 1927 - 1930  T. Gaydon 
 1930 - 1939  A. Adie
 1939 - 1949  E. P. Noakes
 1949 - 1970  F. E. Eastaughffe
 1970 - 1988  A.W. Paith
The above dates included multiple terms.

Population

References

External links
 Queensland Places: Isis Shire

Former local government areas of Queensland
2008 disestablishments in Australia
Populated places disestablished in 2008